Bunnyranch is a Portuguese rock 'n' roll band originally from Coimbra formed by Kaló, Filipe Costa, Pedro Calhau and André Ferrão. After the departure of Filipe Costa and André Ferrão, they were replaced by João Cardoso and Augusto Cardoso. The band was named after a famous American brothel called Moonlite BunnyRanch in Mound House, Nevada in the United States.

Besides being very popular in Portugal, the band also toured Spain, the Netherlands and England. Their stage act is explosive and a hallmark of the band. A documentary film was shot documenting the band's career.

Members

ex-members
 Filipe Costa - keyboard, piano
 André Ferrão - guitar
 Kaló - vocals and drums
 João Cardoso - keyboards, piano and vocals
 Augusto Cardoso - guitar
 Pedro Calhau - bass

Discography

Albums
2004: Trying to Lose [Lux Records]
2006: Luna Dance [Transformadores]
2008: Teach Us Lord... How To Wait [Lux Records]
2010: If You Missed the Last Train

EPs
2002: Too Flop to Boogie (EP) [Lux Records]
2008: Teach Us Lord (EP) (from album Teach Us Lord... How To Wait) [Lux Records]
2008: How To Wait (EP) (from album Teach Us Lord... How To Wait) [Lux Records]

References

External links
Myspace

Portuguese rock music groups
Portuguese indie rock groups
Portuguese garage rock groups
Musical groups established in 2002
Musical groups disestablished in 2012
2002 establishments in Portugal
2012 disestablishments in Portugal